Chrysene is a polycyclic aromatic hydrocarbon (PAH) with the molecular formula  that consists of four fused benzene rings.  It is a natural constituent of coal tar, from which it was first isolated and characterized.  It is also found in creosote at levels of 0.5–6 mg/kg.

The name "chrysene" originates from Greek Χρύσoς (chrysos), meaning "gold", and is due to the golden-yellow color of the crystals of the hydrocarbon, thought to be the proper color of the compound at the time of its isolation and characterization. However, high purity chrysene is colorless, the yellow hue being due to the traces of its yellow-orange isomer tetracene, which cannot be separated easily.

Occurrence

Chrysene is a constituent of tobacco smoke.

Safety
As with other PAHs, chrysene is suspected to be a human carcinogen. Some evidence suggests that it causes cancer in laboratory animals, but chrysene is often contaminated with more strongly carcinogenic compounds. Chrysene is estimated to have about 1% of the toxicity of benzo(a)pyrene.

Derivatives
Derivatives of chrysene include tetrahydrochrysene and 2,8-dihydroxyhexahydrochrysene, which are estrogenic compounds.  The experimental cancer drug crisnatol is a derivative of chrysene.

See also
 Phenanthrene

References

Polycyclic aromatic hydrocarbons
IARC Group 2B carcinogens
Tetracyclic compounds
PBT substances